Constance Wiel Schram (née Nygaard; 27 September 1890, Christiania – 18 September 1955, Oslo) was a Norwegian writer and translator. She was the daughter of William Martin Nygaard (1865–1912) and Constance Wiel (1866–1931). Constance was the eldest of seven siblings, one of her brothers was the publisher, Mads Wiel Nygaard . She married Finn Thomas Andreas Schram on 26 Jul 1912, and they had a son, Andreas.

Partial works

History and biographies
 Norske Kvinners Sanitetsforening. Tiden og menneskene som skapte den. Vekst og virke i femti år. 1896-1946 ("Norwegian Women's Public Health Association. The time and the people who created it. Growth and work in fifty years. 1896-1946"), Oslo 1946
 Florence Nightingale, Oslo 1938
 Keiserarven. Louis Napoleon Bonaparte, Oslo 1926
 Dronning Victoria. En Livsskildring, Kristiania 1922
 Otto v, Bismarck. En livsskidring, Kristiania 1916

Children's books
 Truls på Lofoten 1927
 Truls og Inger og dyrene deres. Fortalt for små barn, Oslo 1925

Translations into Norwegian
 Georg Soloveitsjik: Potemkin. Soldat, statsmann, elsker og Katarina den stores ektefelle, Oslo 1939
 Francis Hackett: Frans den første, Oslo 1935
 Duff Cooper: Talleyrand, Oslo 1933
 Arthur Weigall: Nero - Roms keiser, Oslo 1932
 Stephan Zweig: Joseph Fouché - portrett av et politisk menneske, Oslo 1930
 Jules Verne: En verdensomseiling under havet, Oslo 1930
 E. Phillips Oppenheim: Gullfuglen, Oslo 1929
 Georg Popoff: Dagligliv i Sovjetrusland, Kristiania, 1924.

External links
 Constance Wiel Schram at Store norske leksikon

1890 births
1955 deaths
Writers from Oslo
Norwegian biographers
Women biographers
20th-century Norwegian women writers
20th-century biographers
20th-century Norwegian translators